Ahmad Sobhani (Persian: احمد سبحانی, born 1961 in Tehran) is a retired Iranian diplomat who previously served as Iran's ambassador to Venezuela (2001–06) and Gabon (1995–98), in addition to chargé d'affaires in Armenia (1992–94). He also served as the deputy foreign minister for European and American Affairs under Manouchehr Mottaki (2007–10).

Career 
During the Iran–Iraq War, Sobhani was a member of the Islamic Revolutionary Guard Corps. In 1987, he entered Iran's diplomatic service.

Between July 1992 and September 1994, Sobhani served as Iran's chargé d'affaires in Armenia. He later served as Iran's ambassador to Gabon between March 1995 and July 1998. During this same period he was also the accredited ambassador to Cameroon, Equatorial Guinea, São Tomé and Príncipe and the Central African Republic.

In 1999 he returned to Iran where he served as the Ministry of Foreign Affairs' director for citizenship and refugees affairs until 2001. Between October 2001 and September 2006, Sobhani served as Iran's ambassador to Venezuela, during which the two countries expanded their political, military and economic ties significantly. At that time he also served as the accredited ambassador to Guyana, the Dominican Republic, Haiti, Suriname, Trinidad and Tobago.

Between 2007 and 2010, Sobhani served as deputy foreign minister for European and American affairs, replacing Saeed Jalili. Later, between 2010 and 2013, he served as the director general for West Asia affairs. He has since retired from diplomatic service.

Sobhani has publicly said that diplomats must be "wealth generators" for their countries. Following his retirement he has served as a member of the leadership council of Alend Investment and Development Economic Cooperation Co., a company whose aim is to increase trade between Iran and Latin American countries.

Personal life 
Sobhani's father was assassinated by the People's Mujahedin of Iran in 1982. His brother Hassan Sobhani was killed in battle in 1984 during the Iran-Iraq War.

Sobhani's son Mohammad Javad "Sasha" Sobhani, born in 1988, has attracted international media attention as a result of his social media presence, which includes pictures of him living an extravagant and non-Islamic lifestyle in Europe. Sasha Sobhani's Instagram page currently has 2.1 million followers (as at April 2020). In August 2018, Ahmad Sobhani told Iranian media that he had severed ties with Sasha. He said of their relationship: "He is my son, but in terms of lifestyle and beliefs, he differs from me, and all of my attempts to direct him to the right path failed."

Sobhani's siblings, Hossein and Zahra Sobhani, are the owners of Avin Darou Co., an Iranian pharmaceutical import company founded in 2008. The company has been criticised for being one of the largest recipients of foreign exchange from the Central Bank of Iran at the subsidized official exchange rate.

Honours 
  Grand Cordon of the Order of the Liberator (6 September 2006, Venezuela)

References 

1961 births
Living people
Ambassadors of Iran to Armenia
20th-century diplomats
Ambassadors of Iran to Venezuela
Ambassadors of Iran to Gabon